Surrounded by Light is the debut studio album by the Czech indie pop band Lake Malawi. It was released on 10 November 2017 by Holidays Forever. The album peaked at number 81 on the Czech Albums Chart. The album includes the singles "Prague (In the City)", "Surrounded by Light", "Bottom of the Jungle", "Paris" and "Spaced Out".

Singles
"Prague (In the City)" was released as the lead single from the album on 25 January 2017. "Surrounded by Light" was released as the second single from the album on 20 April 2017. "Bottom of the Jungle" was released as the third single from the album on 8 September 2017. "Paris" was released as the fourth single from the album on 9 November 2017. "Spaced Out" was released as the fifth single from the album on 23 March 2018.

Track listing

Charts

Release history

References

2017 albums